Vyšná Jablonka is a village and municipality in Humenné District in the Prešov Region of north-east Slovakia.

History 
The earliest mention of the village was in the "List of property" of the Lords of Humenne in 1436. From the beginning it was a foresters' village, what appeared until the present day. The fourth period mayor of the village is Emília Čopaková. 
From the nearly 700 inhabitants (1828 – 91 houses; 678 inhabitants) only 50 are now having their living place in Vyšná Jablonka. 
Once there used to be also a watermill, that you can nowadays see at the exposition of folk architecture of the Hummené museum.

Second World War in Vyšná Jablonka 

When the partisans withdrew, only two snipers, Šuhajda and Jacko remained. A short time afterwards, a German tank battalion came through the village and stampeded some horses. The two snipers went to catch them. While doing that they found four German rangers, who were unprepared, as they were full of bravado because of the tank battalion. 
After capturing the Germans, an important piece of information was found out from the feldwebel Otto Vilnes (one of the captured German soldiers), who said that the 82nd division will take the positions at the Low Beskyds on the 26th of December, with the mission to hold the line until the new and fresh 254th infantry division will come.

The Partisan Brigade "Sergej" decided to hold the line from the 82nd division group until the arrival of the Red Army.

On the 26th of December the Germans crossed Vyšná Jablonka and at the "Lukovsky Slip" they were defeated by the Partisans.

Orthodox Church 
The village's first Orthodox church was probably built in the 16th century. It definitely existed in the 17th century, since the first record about the church is from the year 1623, written by the resident priest. In folk tales, it is said that he stayed in the Potok slum.

The present-day church is located in the lower part of the village, at the western hill. Its construction is dated to the year 1766. In the landlord records from Hummené it was first mentioned in 1880.

In the year 1998, the church went to the Greek Catholic Church. The orthodox votaries had to have their masses in one room at the local municipal office.

Through the efforts of Empress Maria Theresa, the Orthodox in this area became united with Rome with the Union of Uzhorod in 1646.  Any church built in this village would have been Greek Catholic, not Orthodox.  The church remained Greek Catholic until the Communists outlawed the Greek Catholic Church and forced Orthodoxy on the people.  The 1869 Census of County Zemplen  (Administrative Records of the County Zemplen, Archive 2 of the County Borsod-Abauj-Zemplen) showed that there were 65 households in the village.  One was Jewish, and if I remember correctly, one was Roman Catholic, all of the rest were Greek Catholic.  In 1869 there were no Orthodox households or individuals in Vyšná Jablonka.

One Roman Catholic is correct.  He was my maternal great grandfather.  He came from Poland with his daughter and mother-in-law and joined the Greek Catholic Church.

Geography 
The village is in the northeast of Slovakia among the Low Beskyds of the Laborec Highlands. It is situated close to the river Rieka which is 3 km (ca. 1.4 miles) away. The municipality lies at an altitude of 385 metres and covers an area of 24,832 km2.
The settlement has the highest elevation in the Humenné district. The next biggest cities being Humenné, Snina and Medzilaborce, 32 km, 25 km and 24 km away, respectively.

Flora & fauna 
The village lies in the northern territories of Slovakia. The population of animals depends on the situation. 
There is a population of wolves (canis lupus), brown bears (ursus arctos), foxes and lynx. They hunt the local deer...

References

External links 
 
 
 https://web.archive.org/web/20080111223415/http://www.statistics.sk/mosmis/eng/run.html 
 http://www.iabsi.com/gen/public/settlements/SL_vysna_jablonka.htm

Villages and municipalities in Humenné District
Zemplín (region)